Sweet Rain is a jazz album by Stan Getz, released on the Verve record label in 1967.

Reception
The Allmusic review by Steve Huey states that Sweet Rain is "one of Stan Getz's all-time greatest albums," and "the quartet's level of musicianship remains high on every selection, and the marvelously consistent atmosphere the album evokes places it among Getz's very best. A surefire classic".

Track listing
"Litha" (Chick Corea) – 8:30
"O Grande Amor" (Antônio Carlos Jobim, Vinicius de Moraes) – 4:44
"Sweet Rain" (Mike Gibbs) – 7:12
"Con Alma"  (Dizzy Gillespie) – 8:06
"Windows" (Corea) – 8:57

Recorded on March 21 (Tracks 1-3) and March 30 (Tracks 4-5), 1967.

Personnel

Musicians
Stan Getz – tenor saxophone
Chick Corea – piano
Ron Carter – bass
Grady Tate – drums

Additional personnel
Producer – Creed Taylor
Engineer – Rudy Van Gelder
Cover photograph – Tom Zimmerman
Director of engineering – Val Valentin
Original liner notes – Johnny Magnus

Chart performance

References

Stan Getz albums
1967 albums
Albums produced by Creed Taylor
Verve Records albums
Albums recorded at Van Gelder Studio